Paul J. Ferri (born December 21, 1937 in Rome, Italy) is the founder and general partner of Matrix Partners, a venture capital firm.

Early life
In 1944, Ferri and his family immigrated to the United States where they settled in Virginia.  His father worked for the government as an aeronautics engineer.  Ferri's family eventually moved to New York City.  Ferri obtained a B.Sc. in electrical engineering from Cornell University, a M.Sc in electrical engineering from the Polytechnic Institute of New York and an M.B.A. from Columbia University.

Career
In 1977, Ferri and Warren Hellman co-founded Hellman Ferri Investment Associates.  After five years, the partners split.  Hellman started Hellman & Friedman in 1984 and Ferri started Matrix Partners in 1982.  In 1999, Ferri co-founded hedge fund Matrix Capital Management with David Goel.

References

Alumni of the London School of Economics
Columbia Business School alumni
Cornell University College of Engineering alumni
Living people
Polytechnic Institute of New York University alumni
American company founders
1937 births